"Fix Up, Look Sharp" is the second single by British rapper Dizzee Rascal and the second from his debut studio album Boy in da Corner. It became his second top forty hit and first to peak inside the top twenty. "Fix Up, Look Sharp" peaked at number seventeen and spent three weeks on the top forty.

The song heavily samples the main beat and vocals from "The Big Beat" by rock musician Billy Squier. The song is sampled in Dan Le Sac Vs Scroobius Pip's song "Fixed". This song was remixed by Ratatat and was featured on their Ratatat Remixes Vol. 1 mixtape.

"Like ragga mixed with hip hop with an incredible, original UK style," enthused Guru of Gang Starr in 2003. "I honestly believe he can sell mad records in the States. He's got good energy, man."

It was featured in the hit documentary Rize and on an episode of Skins, as was the song "Jus' a Rascal". It features briefly in an episode of Smallville and appears in the video game "DJ Hero" in multiple remixes. The song also featured on the UK version of Def Jam Rapstar. In 2012, the track also featured briefly in the animated film ParaNorman.

The song's music video was directed by Ruben Fleischer.

In October 2011, NME placed it at number 25 on its "150 Best Tracks of the Past 15 Years".

Track listing
CD
 "Fix Up, Look Sharp" (clean radio edit)
 "Stop Dat" 
 "I Luv U" (video)

Charts

Certifications

References

2002 songs
2003 singles
Dizzee Rascal songs
XL Recordings singles
Songs written by Dizzee Rascal
Songs written by Billy Squier
Music videos directed by Ruben Fleischer